La Solidaridad was an anarchist weekly newspaper from Madrid, founded by Anselmo Lorenzo in 1870.

History 
It was the first newspaper to defend the International Workingmen's Association (IWA), as the official organ of the Madrid section. It supported collectivist anarchist ideas, disseminated the resolutions, statutes and communiqués of the workers' congresses, and addressed issues related to the labor movement. Its editors and collaborators included Tomás González Morago, Enrique Simancas, Máximo Ambau, Francisco Mora Méndez and Víctor Pagés, in addition to publishing articles by Mikhail Bakunin and Pierre-Joseph Proudhon.

At the beginning of August 1870, La Solidaridad published an article opposed to the Franco-Prussian War entitled The War, which was signed by Pablo Iglesias, a young typographer who had just arrived in Madrid and joined the International.

References

Bibliography 

Anarchist periodicals
Publications established in 1870
Publications disestablished in 1871